Tazlina Lake is a body of water,  long, in the U.S. state of Alaska. It is a remnant of ancient Lake Atna.

History 
The Russian Shturman Serebrenikov appears to have been the first "white man" to reach this lake; according to his notes he was here on May 30, 1848. He recorded the name as "Plavezhnoye Ozero," or "Plavezhni Lake." He reported two Indian families living on the lake (Allen, 1887, p. 21.).

Etymology 
Local name taken from the stream that drains the lake, reported in 1898 by F. C. Schrader, USGS.

See also 
List of lakes of Alaska

References

Lakes of Alaska
Lakes of Copper River Census Area, Alaska